Merlise Aycock Clyde is an American statistician known for her work in model averaging for Bayesian statistics. She is a Professor of Statistical Science and immediate past chair of the Department of Statistical Science at Duke University. She was president of the International Society for Bayesian Analysis (ISBA) in 2013, 
and chair of the Section on Bayesian Statistical Science of the American Statistical Association for 2018.

Education
Clyde graduated from Oregon State University in 1985 with a Bachelor of Science in Forestry. She earned two master's degrees, one from the University of Alberta in 1986 in Forest Biometrics and another from the University of California, Riverside in 1988 in Statistics, before completing her Ph.D. at the University of Minnesota in 1993 in Statistics. Her dissertation, supervised by Kathryn Chaloner, was Bayesian Optimal Designs for Approximate Normality, which received the Savage Award for outstanding dissertation in Bayesian econometrics and statistics in 1994.

Awards and honors
Clyde is a fellow of the American Statistical Association, of ISBA, and of the Institute of Mathematical Statistics. She was one of two winners of the Zellner Medal of the ISBA in 2016 "for their outstanding service to ISBA".

References

External links
Home page

American women statisticians
Oregon State University alumni
University of Alberta alumni
University of California, Riverside alumni
University of Minnesota College of Liberal Arts alumni
Duke University faculty
Fellows of the American Statistical Association
Fellows of the Institute of Mathematical Statistics
Year of birth missing (living people)
Living people